The Pecos Pistol is a short 1949 American Western film directed by Will Cowan and starring Tex Williams, Smokey Rogers, and Barbara Payton. This is a black and white film, a partial remake of 1941 film Rawhide Rangers by Ray Taylor.

Plot
Someone dear to Tex Williams was killed, so he decides to get himself kicked from the force and disguise himself as an outlaw. Now he has to infiltrate the gang of outlaws and come up with a plan to find the killer and bring the gang down.

Cast
Tex Williams as Tex Williams
Smokey Rogers as Smokey
Deuce Spriggins as Deuce
Barbara Payton as Kay McCormick
Bill Cassady as Ben Williams
Forrest Taylor as Capt. McCormick
Terry Frost as Parker
George Lloyd as Rocky
Monte Montague as Harris

References

External links
 

1949 films
American black-and-white films
American Western (genre) films
1949 Western (genre) films
Universal Pictures films
1940s English-language films
1940s American films
Remakes of American films